Uncle and Claudius the Camel (1969) is a children's novel written by J. P. Martin, the fifth of his Uncle book series of six books. It was illustrated, like the others in the series, by Quentin Blake.

References

1969 British novels
1969 children's books
British children's novels
Children's fantasy novels
Books about elephants
Jonathan Cape books